Lepir is a town in north-eastern Iran, in Chaharmahal and Bakhtiari Province at 31.6002778 N 50.4 E.

References

Populated places in Chaharmahal and Bakhtiari Province